Ursula Pollack (born 27 October 1919) is a German freestyle swimmer who competed in the 1936 Summer Olympics. She was born in Berlin. In 1936 she was a member of the German relay team that won the silver medal in the 4 × 100 metre freestyle relay event. Pollack swam in the semi-final and helped the team to qualify for the final. She did not compete in the final, and was not therefore awarded a medal.

External links
Ursula Pollack's profile at Sports Reference.com
 

1919 births
Possibly living people
Swimmers from Berlin
German female swimmers
Olympic swimmers of Germany
Swimmers at the 1936 Summer Olympics